The Idler was a 19th-century schooner-yacht built in 1864 by Samuel Hartt Pook from Fairhaven, Connecticut and owned by yachtsman Thomas C. Durant. She was one of the fastest yachts in the New York  squadron. Idler came in 2nd place in the America’s Cup defense in 1870. She was sold as a racing yacht several times before she capsized and sank in 1900.

Construction and service 

The Idler was a luxury schooner yacht built in the summer of 1864 by the Samuel Hartt Pook shipyard in Fairhaven, Connecticut. She was owned by yachtsman Thomas C. Durant and part of the New York Yacht Squadron.

The Idler, was registered as a yacht schooner with the ‘’Record of American and Foreign Shipping,’’ from 1886 to 1900. Her ship master was Edward Colby; her owners were Samuel J. Colgate; built in 1865 at Fairhaven, Connecticut; and her hailing port was the Port of New York. Her dimensions were 95.7 ft. in length; 22.6 ft. breadth of beam; 11 ft. depth of hold; and 85-tons  Tonnage.

New York Yacht Club races

In August 1868, Thomas C. Durant, of the  schooner Idler, fired the starting gun and gave two prizes for the New York Yacht Club schooner and sloop race in Newport, Rhode Island. The race included the yachts Dauntless, Gracie, Magic, Widgeon, Phantom, Fleetwing and other schooners and sloops. The course was from the northeast point of Block Island, rounding it from the north west, and returning to the same point.

In June 1869, the schooner Idler was in the annual June New York Yacht Club regatta. She raced against the Phantom, Alarm, Palmer, Slivie and other schooners and sloops. The course was from Owl's Head to the S.W. Split, then across to the  Sandy Hook Lightship and back. The Idler came in 1st place at 4hr. 24min, and 30 secs.

1870 America's cup

On August 8, 1870, the international 1870 America's Cup (also called the Queen's Cup) was the first America's Cup to be hosted in the United States at New York Harbor. Thomas C. Durant with his American schooner Idler was in the competition. The course started from the Staten Island N.Y.Y.C anchorage down through the Narrows to the S.W. Split buoy, across to the  Sandy Hook lightship and return to Staten Island. The race was won by the Franklin Osgood's Magic with the Idler finishing in 2nd place. Franklin Osgood's yacht Magic beat 16 competitors from the New York Yacht Club, including James Lloyd Ashbury's English yacht Cambria that sailed to New York on behalf of the Royal Thames Yacht Club and the yachts Dauntless, Idler, Fleetwing, Phantom, America and others.

In March 1873, Durant sold the schooner yacht Idler to Samuel J. Colgate of the N.Y.Y.C. He rebuilt her at the Henry Steers shipyard in Greenpoint, Brooklyn. She was lengthened eight feet and her topmasts were increased to carry more sail.

In August 1874, the Idler was in the New York Yacht Club annual cruise of the New York Yacht Squadron. The race was for a set of colors for each class. The course was from off Brenton's Reef lightship and finish at Oak Bluffs. She competed against the Dauntless, Idler, Alarm, and Josephine yachts.

After racing for over twenty-five years, in 1890 A. J. Fisher sold the Idler to John Cudahay, a millionaire owner of the Cudahay Packing Company. After the 1893 panic, Cudahay lost his fortune and sold the yacht to W. D. Boyce in 1896. He refurbished the Idler and raced her. In the fall of 1899, James C. Corrigan bought the Idler as a pleasure yacht. He refurbished her at a cost of $8,000 and moved her to Fairport Harbor, Ohio on Lake Erie.

End of service

On July 7, 1900, the Idler capsized in a squall on Lake Erie off Cleveland killing six members of the family of John A. and James Corrigan, the owners of the vessel. John A. and James C. Corrigan left the boat early to attend other matters. The only survivors were Captain Charles Joseph Holmes, master of the schooner, Mrs. John Corrigan and six crewmen. The yacht was raised on July 15th. Captain Charles J. Holmes was arrested and accused of criminal negligence. The trial never occurred as Holmes was bailed out of jail and the case was dropped.

References

External links
 America's Cup
 THE RACE OF THE FIRST CHALLENGE

   

Schooners of the United States
Individual sailing vessels
Ships built in New York City
Yachts of New York Yacht Club members
1864 ships
America's Cup challengers
America's Cup regattas
1870 in American sports
1870 in sailing